I due toreri is a 1965 Italian-Spanish comedy film directed by Giorgio Simonelli starring the comic duo Franco and Ciccio.

Plot
In Sicily Franco and Ciccio are empowered by a local mafia man to guard for a wide range of salad. In reality however this is not simple salad vegetables but marijuana; the two bungling fools and friends do not realize it at first. Indeed, seeing that with this delicious salad could make us profits, steal it and are discovered by the police. The policemen, discovering the marijuana, would stop Franco and Ciccio which however manage admirably to escape and to embark for Spain. There are exchanged for two famous bullfighters and sent to compete with ferocious bulls in bullfights.

Cast
Franco Franchi	as 	Franco Scontentezza
Ciccio Ingrassia	as  	Ciccio Scontentezza
Fernando Sancho	as  	Don Alonso
Rossella Como	as  	Dolores
Silvia Solar	as  	Margaret
Maria Teresa Vianello	as  	Paulette
Elisa Montés	as 	Manuela
Carlo Romano	as 	Joe Ragusa
Nino Terzo	as 	Jannot
Eduardo Fajardo	as  	Inspector N.B.
Tom Felleghy	as   	Pierre (as Tom Felleghi)
Gino Buzzanca	as 	Maresciallo
Enzo Fiermonte as  Ship Captain 
Rosalia Maggio
Enzo Andronico

External links
 
 I due toreri at Variety Distribution

1965 films
1950s Italian-language films
Films directed by Giorgio Simonelli
1960s buddy comedy films
Italian buddy comedy films
Films set in Spain
1965 comedy films
1960s Italian films
1950s Italian films